In music, transposition refers to the process or operation of moving a collection of notes (pitches or pitch classes) up or down in pitch by a constant interval.

For example, one might transpose an entire piece of music into another key.  Similarly, one might transpose a tone row or an unordered collection of pitches such as a chord so that it begins on another pitch.

Scalar transpositions
In scalar transposition, every pitch in a collection is shifted up or down a fixed number of scale steps within some scale.  The pitches remain in the same scale before and after the shift.  This term covers both chromatic and diatonic transpositions as follows.

Chromatic transposition
Chromatic transposition is scalar transposition within the chromatic scale, implying that every pitch in a collection of notes is shifted by the same number of semitones.  For instance, transposing the pitches C4–E4–G4 upward by four semitones, one obtains the pitches E4–G4–B4.

Diatonic transposition
Diatonic transposition is scalar transposition within a diatonic scale (the most common kind of scale, indicated by one of a few standard key signatures).  For example, transposing the pitches C4–E4–G4 up two steps in the familiar C major scale gives the pitches E4–G4–B4.  Transposing the same pitches up by two steps in the F major scale instead gives E4–G4–B4.

Pitch and pitch class transpositions
There are two further kinds of transposition, by pitch interval or by pitch interval class, applied to pitches or pitch classes, respectively. Transposition may be applied to pitches or to pitch classes. For example, the pitch A4, or 9, transposed by a major third, or the pitch interval 4:

while that pitch class, 9, transposed by a major third, or the pitch class interval 4:
.

Sight transposition

Although transpositions are usually written out, musicians are occasionally asked to transpose music "at sight", that is, to read the music in one key while playing in another. Musicians who play transposing instruments sometimes have to do this (for example when encountering an unusual transposition, such as clarinet in C), as well as singers' accompanists, since singers sometimes request a different key than the one printed in the music to better fit their vocal range (although many, but not all, songs are printed in editions for high, medium, and low voice).

There are three basic techniques for teaching sight transposition: interval, clef, and numbers.

Interval
First one determines the interval between the written key and the target key. Then one imagines the notes up (or down) by the corresponding interval. A performer using this method may calculate each note individually, or group notes together (e.g. "a descending chromatic passage starting on F" might become a "descending chromatic passage starting on A" in the target key).

Clef
Clef transposition is routinely taught (among other places) in Belgium and France. One imagines a different clef and a different key signature than the ones printed. The change of clef is used so that the lines and spaces correspond to different notes than the lines and spaces of the original score. Seven clefs are used for this: treble (2nd line G-clef), bass (4th line F-clef), baritone (3rd line F-clef or 5th line C-clef, although in France and Belgium sight-reading exercises for this clef, as a preparation for clef transposition practice, are always printed with the 3rd line F-clef), and C-clefs on the four lowest lines; these allow any given staff position to correspond to each of the seven note names A through G. The signature is then adjusted for the actual accidental (natural, sharp or flat) one wants on that note. The octave may also have to be adjusted (this sort of practice ignores the conventional octave implication of the clefs), but this is a trivial matter for most musicians.

Numbers
Transposing by numbers means, one determines the scale degree of the written note (e.g. first, fourth, fifth, etc.) in the given key. The performer then plays the corresponding scale degree of the target chord.

Transpositional equivalence

Two musical objects are transpositionally equivalent if one can be transformed into another by transposition.  It is similar to enharmonic equivalence, octave equivalence, and inversional equivalence.  In many musical contexts, transpositionally equivalent chords are thought to be similar.  Transpositional equivalence is a feature of musical set theory. The terms transposition and transposition equivalence allow the concept to be discussed as both an operation and relation, an activity and a state of being. Compare with modulation and related key.

Using integer notation and modulo 12, to transpose a pitch x by n semitones:

or

For pitch class transposition by a pitch class interval:

Twelve-tone transposition

Milton Babbitt defined the "transformation" of transposition within the twelve-tone technique as follows:
By applying the transposition operator (T) to a [twelve-tone] set we will mean that every p of the set P is mapped homomorphically (with regard to order) into a T(p) of the set T(P) according to the following operation:

where to is any integer 0–11 inclusive, where, of course, the to remains fixed for a given transposition. The + sign indicates ordinary transposition. Here To is the transposition corresponding to to (or o, according to Schuijer); pi,j is the pitch of the ith tone in P belong to the pitch class (set number) j.

Allen Forte defines transposition so as to apply to unordered sets of other than twelve pitches:
the addition mod 12 of any integer k in S to every integer p of P.
thus giving, "12 transposed forms of P".

Fuzzy transposition
Joseph Straus created the concept of fuzzy transposition, and fuzzy inversion, to express transposition as a voice-leading event, "the 'sending' of each element of a given PC [pitch-class] set to its Tn-correspondent...[enabling] him to relate PC sets of two adjacent chords in terms of a transposition, even when not all of the 'voices' participated fully in the transpositional move.". A transformation within voice-leading space rather than pitch-class space as in pitch class transposition.

See also
Modulation (music)
Music transposer
Pitch shift
Transposing instrument
Capo

References

External links
 Chords transposition in song sheets plus showing these chords for different instruments
 Chords transposition
 ChordSmith: Java program to transpose chords in song sheets
 Online Tool to transpose songs
 Chordchanger.com: online tool to transpose guitar chords

Musical techniques
Pitch (music)